Mount Cardinal is a summit in Alberta, Canada.

Mount Cardinal was named after Jacques Cardinal, a businessperson in the fur industry.

References

Cardinal
Alberta's Rockies